Chasht Khvor (also Romanized as Chāsht Khvor, Chāsht Khur, and Chāshtkhvār; also known as Chāsht Khowd and Jāsht Khowr) is a village in Shurab Rural District, in the Central District of Arsanjan County, Fars Province, Iran. At the 2006 census, its population was 264, in 62 families.

A rock-cut Achaemenid monument called Qadamgah is located near the village.

References 

Populated places in Arsanjan County